Steppin' Out is the second studio album released by jazz saxophonist George Howard. It was first released as an LP record in 1984 by Palo Alto Records and reached as number nine on the Billboard Top Jazz Albums chart. When Howard rejoined GRP Records in 1990, they acquired the rights to his previous albums and re-released this album on compact disc in 1992.

Track listing
"Steppin' Out" (Howard) - 6:15
"Philly Talk" (Burke, Gant, Howard, Williams) - 5:06
"A Tear of Spring" (Howard) - 5:34
"Dr. Rock" (Gant, Howard) - 4:40
"Human Nature" (Bettis, Porcaro) - 5:28
"Sweet Dreams (Are Made of This)" (Lennox, Stewart) - 3:48
"Dream Ride" (Gant, Howard, Reklaw) - 5:00

Personnel
Keni Burke, Nathan East - bass guitar
Leon "Ndugu" Chancler - percussion, drums, timbales
Dean Gant - producer, synthesizer, arranger, keyboards,  mixing
George Howard - percussion, arranger, sax (soprano), producer, mixing
Curtis King, Brenda White - vocals (background)
David Williams - guitar

Production:
Andy Baltimore - creative director
Joan Ingoldsby Brown, Scott Johnson, Sonny Mediana, Andy Ruggirello, Dan Serrano  - design
Katy Cavanaugh, Herb Wong - art direction
Joseph Doughney, Michael Landy, Adam Zelinka - post production
Al Evers  - executive producer
Joe Ferla, Wally Grant - engineer, mixing
George Horn - mastering
Doreen Kalcich, Michael Pollard - production coordination
Darryl Pitt - photography

Charts

External links
 

1985 albums
George Howard (jazz) albums
Palo Alto Records albums